Pauli Kuusijärvi (born 21 March 1986) is a  is a Finnish footballer who currently plays for IF Gnistan in the Kakkonen, the premier division, which is the third tier of the Finnish football league system. He has primarily played as a midfielder throughout his career.

Career
Kuusijärvi was born in Espoo, where he played for FC Honka at youth level. From there he moved to another local club, FC Espoo, for which he played 2007-2010 and acted as the captain of the team. Kuusijärvi returned to his former youth club, FC Honka, in February 2011. During his first season on the Finnish top level, Veikkausliiga, he played in four matches. After his year in Honka, he transferred to Valkeakosken Haka. For Haka he played in 22 matches in total. In 2013, he moved to Gnistan.

From 2014 he has played for HIFK.

References

External links

Finnish footballers
Association football defenders
Veikkausliiga players
Ykkönen players
Kakkonen players
1986 births
Living people
FC Espoo players
IF Gnistan players
Pallohonka players
HIFK Fotboll players
Footballers from Espoo